The following is a partial list of currently operating schools in Wales, United Kingdom. You may also find :Category:Schools in Wales of use to find a particular school. See also the List of the oldest schools in the United Kingdom.

The list is grouped by principal admininstrative areas in Wales - these may not be the same as the Local Education Authorities.

Anglesey

Blaenau Gwent

Bridgend

Caerphilly

Cardiff

Carmarthenshire

Ceredigion

Conwy

Denbighshire

Flintshire

Gwynedd

Merthyr Tydfil

Monmouthshire

Neath Port Talbot

Newport

Pembrokeshire

Powys

Rhondda Cynon Taf

Swansea

Torfaen

Vale of Glamorgan

Wrexham

See also
Education in Wales
Estyn, the education and training inspectorate for Wales
Primary education in Wales
Secondary education in Wales
Treachery of the Blue Books
Education in the United Kingdom
List of private schools in the United Kingdom

External links
The website UK Schools & Colleges Database lists currently operating state (and some independent) schools by Local Education Authority and also links to websites of individual schools where available.

 
 
Schools
Schools